The 2001–02 season was the 66th season in the existence of US Créteil-Lusitanos and the club's third consecutive season in the second division of French football. In addition to the domestic league, US Créteil-Lusitanos competed in this season's edition of the Coupe de France and Coupe de la Ligue. The season covered the period from 1 July 2001 to 30 June 2002.

Players

First-team squad

Transfers

In

Out

Pre-season and friendlies

Competitions

Overall record

French Division 2

League table

Results summary

Results by round

Matches

Coupe de France

Coupe de la Ligue

Statistics

Squad statistics

|-
! colspan=14 style=background:#dcdcdc; text-align:center|Goalkeepers

|-
! colspan=14 style=background:#dcdcdc; text-align:center|Defenders

|-
! colspan=14 style=background:#dcdcdc; text-align:center|Midfielders

|-
! colspan=14 style=background:#dcdcdc; text-align:center|Forwards

|-
! colspan=14 style=background:#dcdcdc; text-align:center| Players who have made an appearance or had a squad number this season but have left the club

|}

Goalscorers

References 

US Créteil-Lusitanos seasons
US Créteil-Lusitanos